The 2004 election of members to the Senate of the Philippines was the 28th election to the Senate of the Philippines. It was held on Monday, May 10, 2004, to elect 12 of the 24 seats in the Senate. The major coalitions that participated are the Koalisyon ng Katapatan at Karanasan sa Kinabukasan, composed of parties that support the candidacy of President Gloria Macapagal Arroyo, and the Koalisyon ng Nagkakaisang Pilipino, composed of parties that support the candidacy of film actor Fernando Poe Jr. coalition. The Alyansa ng Pag-asa was a minor coalition made up of Aksyon Demokratiko and Partido para sa Demokratikong Reporma–Lapiang Manggagawa. K4 won seven seats, while the KNP won the remaining five contested seats. 

The elections were notable for several reasons. This election first saw the implementation of the Overseas Absentee Voting Act of 2003 (see Wikisource), which enabled Filipinos in over 70 countries to vote.

Parties and coalitions
This election has seen strong shifts of alliances and new parties as candidates switched allegiances. The two major coalitions seen in this elections were the pro-administration K-4 and the KNP as the "united opposition".

Koalisyon ng Katapatan at Karanasan sa Kinabukasan (K-4)
The Koalisyon ng Katapatan at Karanasan sa Kinabukasan (Coalition of Honesty and Experience for the Future) was the remnant of the People Power Coalition that was formed following the ascendancy of President Gloria Macapagal-Arroyo to power. Arroyo was seeking a full term under the K4 coalition with Senator Noli de Castro, an independent, popular politician, as her running mate. The leading party in this coalition is the ruling Lakas—Christian Muslim Democrats, of which Arroyo was a member. Other parties under this coalition are Liberal Party, Nacionalista Party, Nationalist People's Coalition and People's Reform Party.

Koalisyon ng Nagkakaisang Pilipino (KNP)
The Koalisyon ng Nagkakaisang Pilipino (Coalition of United Filipinos) was the coalition of the "united opposition". Its presidential and vice-presidential candidates were Fernando Poe Jr. and Senator Loren Legarda. The leading parties of this coalition were Laban ng Demokratikong Pilipino—Angara wing, PDP–Laban, and Pwersa ng Masang Pilipino. The LDP split had been caused by stubbornness between presidentiables Poe and Senator Panfilo Lacson, especially with Poe's support from former President Joseph Estrada and former First Lady Imelda Marcos. The other major party under this coalition was Estrada's Partido ng Masang Pilipino.

Alyansa ng Pag-asa
The third major coalition running in this election is the Alyansa ng Pag-asa (Alliance of Hope), This coalition fielded Raul Roco for president and Herminio Aquino for vice-president. The three major parties supporting this coalition were Roco's Aksyon Demokratiko, former National Defense Secretary Renato de Villa's Partido para sa Demokratikong Reporma, and former Cebu Governor Lito Osmeña's Probinsya Muna Development Initiative. These three parties bolted from the People Power Coalition.

Bangon Pilipinas Movement (BPM)
Bangon Pilipinas (Rise Up, Philippines) is the political party of Bro. Eduardo Villanueva. It consisted mostly of volunteers, a majority of whom came from Villanueva's Jesus Is Lord church. Villanueva resigned from the church before submitting his candidacy in order to prevent questions on the separation of church and state.

Laban ng Demokratikong Pilipino (LDP)—(Aquino Wing)
This coalition led by Makati Representative Butz Aquino was composed of Panfilo Lacson's supporters from LDP party.

Partido Isang Bansa, Isang Diwa
This was Eddie Gil's organization. Gil was deemed a nuisance candidate and was disqualified from the presidential race. However, the party qualified for other positions.

Candidates

Administration coalition

Primary opposition coalition

Others

Retiring and term limited incumbents

 Tessie Aquino-Oreta (LDP), did not run in 2004, ran in 2007 and lost
 Ramon Revilla Sr. (Lakas), term limited, retired from politics
 Gregorio Honasan (Independent), term limited, ran in 2007 and won
 Tito Sotto (LDP), term limited, ran in 2007 and lost, ran in 2010 and won

Mid-term vacancies
 Rene Cayetano (Lakas), died on June 25, 2003
 Blas Ople (LDP), appointed Secretary of Foreign Affairs on July 16, 2002, died on December 14, 2003

Incumbents running elsewhere
 Noli de Castro (Independent), ran for vice president and won
 Loren Legarda (KNP), ran for vice president and lost

Results 
The Koalisyon ng Katapatan at Karanasan sa Kinabukasan (K4) won seven seats, while the Koalisyon ng Nagkakaisang Pilipino (KNP) won five.

Incumbent KNP senator Aquilino Pimentel Jr. and K4 senator Rodolfo Biazon successfully defended their seats.

K4's Pia Cayetano, Dick Gordon, Lito Lapid, Jamby Madrigal, Bong Revilla, Mar Roxas and KNP's Jinggoy Estrada and Alfredo Lim are the neophyte senators.

Returning are K4's Miriam Defensor Santiago and KNP's Juan Ponce Enrile, who were both defeated in 2001.

K4's Robert Barbers John Henry Osmeña and Robert Jaworski both lost their seats.

The election of Noli de Castro as Vice President of the Philippines in concurrent elections means that his Senate seat will be vacant until June 30, 2007.

Key:
 ‡ Seats up
 + Gained by a party from another party
 √ Held by the incumbent
 * Held by the same party with a new senator
^ Vacancy

Per candidate
The official results of the election were released in staggered dates with most winners in local elective positions declared within two weeks from the May 10 election date. The winners in the Senatorial and Party-list Representative elections were declared on May 24, with the exception of the 12th senator which was announced on June 3. The results of the Presidential and Vice-Presidential races were finalized by the Congress on June 20, more than a month after the elections. Out of the 43,536,028 registered voters, about 35.4 million ballots were cast giving a voter turn-out of 81.4%.

Per coalition

Per party

See also
Commission on Elections
Politics of the Philippines
Philippine elections
President of the Philippines
13th Congress of the Philippines

External links

General sites
Philippine Presidency Project
Philippine Commission on Elections
National Movement for Free Elections (NAMFREL)

Media sites and articles
Eleksyon 2004 (Media website)
4 exit polls have 3 different winners - Philippine Daily Inquirer
Proberz exit polls: FPJ winner
Congress approves canvassing rules - Philippine Daily Inquirer
SWS admits it made errors in exit poll - Philippine Daily Inquirer

Others
On Election Polls: Part IV WHO DID BETTER - SWS OR PULSE ASIA? - Dr. Romula A. Virola
Dec. 30, 2002 Arroyo speech declaring her intention not to run
P.E.T. Case No. 003, Legarda vs. De Castro

References

2004
2004 Philippine general election